Shyam Sundar Goswami is an Indian classical vocalist, trained in Kirana Gharana.

Early life
Goswami was born to Pravupada Dwijendranath Goswami who was a spiritual teacher (guru) and a Sanskrit scholar. Shyam received his first training from his mother, Maya Goswami, after which he was trained by Jadunath Chakraborty and Madan Mohan Thakur. He studied Indian classical music at Rabindra Bharati University, from where he got an Honours degree. He did his M.A. degree in khyal from the same university. He sings khayal, thumris and bhajans

Career

Goswami's repertoire includes khayals, thumris and bhajans. He has been actively working to revive the beauty of medieval songs (prabandh sangeet, kirtans), a lost heritage of Indian classical music. He has mastered the songs of "Geet Govind", a work of poetry and songs by Jayadeva.

For continuing his research in music he got a scholarship from the French Government and worked at La Cite Internationale Das Arts in Paris with other musicians.

Goswami has performed in India and in Europe, Morocco, and South Africa. The first CD album of Goswami, named "Peace and Harmony" was released on 24 April 2006. In February 2017, Goswami performed Hindustani Classical Music at the "Sacrées Journeés de Strasbourg" festival in France where along with him musicians from around the globe, viz. Russia, Syria, Lebanon, Nepal, Mongolia, Morocco, Algeria , and Turkey presented the traditional music indigenous to their respective countries and celebrated the unity of all religions and global peace.

Goswami has been conducting workshops in various educational institutions in India and abroad to educate people on the merits of Indian music : Le College des Cordeliers Dinan (France), Rabindra Maitree University, Islamic University (Bangladesh), Rabindra Bharati University (Kolkata, India), etc.

Awards
Goswami was honored by Association Drapeau de la Paix, Marseille (France) in 2018. In the same year he was awarded the Kabi Krishnadas Kabiraj Samman.

References

Hindustani singers
Kirana gharana
Indian male singers
Living people
Swarmandal players
Year of birth missing (living people)